Bassenhally Pit is an  biological Site of Special Scientific Interest north-east of Whittlesey in Cambridgeshire.

This former gravel quarry has diverse habitats, such as a pond, marshes, grassland, scrub and woodland. The marsh is a nationally scarce habitat, and it has plants including jointed rush, creeping bent, lesser water-plantain, early marsh-orchid and water violet.

The site is owned by the Whittlesey Wildfowlers and Conservationists, and there is no public access.

References

Sites of Special Scientific Interest in Cambridgeshire